Phoenix Rising (Traditional Chinese: 蘭花刼) is a TVB period drama series released overseas in July 2007 and aired on TVB Pay Vision Channel in March 2008. The drama was well received from the viewer in international broadcast. The show has been compared to 1989's hit drama, Looking Back In Anger.

The Series was subsequently released on 2 January 2009 on Cambodia cable TV, PPCTV as the last country in showing it.

In an unprecedented move by TVB, 11 years after production, it has been announced that the drama will premiere from 29 May 2017 on TVB Jade, with footage and audio digitally remastered for broadcast.

Plot 
Kong Lai-Nga, Yim Pui-Woo and So Fei are sisters. Their parents died at birth, so the three of them were sent to orphanages and were later adopted into three different homes with different backgrounds. Yim Pui-Woo was sent to prison for killing her stepmother, but Kong Lai-Nga, wanting to save her sister, told officials that she was the one who committed the crime and went to prison instead. So Fei is a very kind person and forges evidence to save Kong Lai-Nga but gets caught and gets sent to prison, too. The three sisters and the prison owner have some hostilities; thus, the prison owner wants revenge. This series uses women in jail as its storyline, describing the dark side of women in prison.

Cast

References

External links
TVB.com Phoenix Rising - Official Website 
K for TVB.net Phoenix Rising - Episodic Synopsis and Screen Captures 

TVB dramas
2007 Hong Kong television series debuts
2007 Hong Kong television series endings
2008 Hong Kong television series debuts
2008 Hong Kong television series endings